China's family planning policies (Chinese: 计划生育政策) have included specific birth quotas (three-child policy, two-child policy and the one-child policy) as well as harsh enforcements of such quotas.  Together, these elements constitute the population planning program of the People's Republic of China. China's program should not be confused with the family planning programs instituted in other countries, which were designed to encourage parents to have the number of children they desired—in China, the provision of contraception through family planning programs was subservient to a birth planning program under which the government designated how many births parents could have in order to control the size of its population.

In Chairman Mao Zedong's time, the Chinese government had ambiguous and changing attitude towards family planning, especially during the Great Leap Forward. Family planning was first introduced in the 1950s as a "recommendation", yet had never been strictly implemented until 1970, when the Military Control Commission of China's Ministry of Health announced that contraceptives would be provided free of charge, and Premier Zhou Enlai enacted population growth targets for urban and rural areas, respectively.  Malthusian concerns continued, with two-child restrictions starting in the early 1970s under the later-longer-fewer program. 

After Mao died in 1976, the policy evolved into the one-child policy in 1979, when a group of senior leaders decided that existing birth restrictions were insufficient to cope with what they saw to be a overpopulation crisis. But the one-child policy allowed many exceptions and ethnic minorities were exempt. 

In late 2015, the remnants of one-child limits were lifted and reverted back to two-child limits as had been in place during the 1970s. And in May 2021, the Xi Jinping Administration formally introduced the three-child policy to replace the two-child policy. After only two months, in July 2021, the government removed all penalties for couples who have more children than they are allowed.

History 
Birth planning policy in China was not a top-down process that developed in a linear fashion. As academic Sarah Mellors Rodriguez writes, the policy process was "circuitous, convoluted, and contested."

Mao Zedong era 
Shortly after the founding of the People's Republic of China in October 1949, Mao Zedong and the Chinese Communist Party encouraged Chinese people to have many children, imitating policies such as "Mother Heroine" from the Soviet Union. The Chinese communist government condemned birth control and banned imports of contraceptives.

In 1953, the First National Population Census of China was conducted upon the suggestion of Ma Yinchu, then President of Peking University. The result showed a total population of more than 600 million (some 100 million increase from the number in 1949) as well as rapid growth of the population, with an annual increase rate over 2.2%. As a result, the family planning policies were approved and recommended by the Chinese government.

China's first birth planning campaign began in 1954 with the repeal of the ban on contraception, although official efforts to promote the birth planning campaign did not begin in earnest until 1956.

In 1957, Mao started to change his attitude and Ma, who supported family planning, was widely criticized in the "Anti-rightist Campaign" and was forced to resign as the President of Peking University in 1960. In 1958, Mao launched the Great Leap Forward and began to promote population growth again, saying it was still good to have more people. The disastrous Great Leap Forward led to the Great Chinese Famine (1959–1961), during which approximately 15-55 million people died. 

Then in 1962, a baby boom followed, and the Second National Population Census in 1964 showed a total population of around 700 million in mainland China. Since 1962, the government began to promote family planning again, but it was rather ineffective and was interrupted by the Cultural Revolution starting in 1966. As a result, the population increase rate in China remained very high. In 1971, the country's total population reached 852 million.

In 1971, Mao's attitude changed again, and the government began to promote family planning more sufficiently, causing the annual increase rate to drop below 2% after 1974. The policies at the time encouraged two children per family, and the slogan was "Late, Long and Few" or "wan, xi, shao (晚, 稀, 少)", meaning late marriage and childbearing, birth spacing (at least 3 years between two births), and fertility limitation (no more than two children). However, by the time Mao died in 1976, population in China had exceeded 900 million.

One-child policy 

Starting 1979, given the overpopulation crisis at the time, China's new paramount leader Deng Xiaoping, together with other senior leaders including elder Chen Yun, Premier Zhao Ziyang and President Li Xiannian, began to promote the so-called "one-child policy" in mainland China. In the late spring of 1979, Chen became the first leader to propose the one-child policy, saying on 1 June that:Comrade Xiannian proposed to me planning "better one, at most two". I'd say be stricter, stipulating that "only one is allowed". Prepare to be criticized by others for cutting off the offspring. But if we don't do it, the future looks grim. On 15 October 1979, Deng met with a British delegation led by Felix Greene in Beijing,  saying that "we encourage one child per couple. We give economic rewards to those who promise to give birth to only one child." The policy soon began to be enforced nationwide, with some exceptions made for ethnic minorities and rural families. In particular, Ma Yinchu was rehabilitated during the "Boluan Fanzheng" period. In 1982, the Third National Population Census showed that the population in China had reached 1 billion, and at the end of the year, family planning became a fundamental policy in China (基本国策) as well as a constitutional duty.

Leaders after Deng, mostly the administrations of Jiang Zemin and Hu Jintao, continued promoting and imposing the one-child policy in most areas of mainland China. From 1990 to 2010, the population in China grew from 1.13 billion (the Fourth National Population Census) to 1.34 billion (the Sixth National Population Census), with a very low total fertility rate. In 2007, 36% of China's population was subject to a strict one-child restriction, with an additional 53% being allowed to have a second child if the first child was a girl. Provincial governments imposed fines for violations, and the local and national governments created commissions to raise awareness and carry out registration and inspection work. However, over the years, the one-child policy had created much controversy, even within mainland China, especially over the human rights abuses due to its strict measures.  

According to the Chinese government (2007 & 2013), some 400 million births had been prevented due to its population control program since the 1970s. Some observers have called this estimate "bogus". However, the alternate model of 16 comparator countries proposed by these observers to refute the official estimate implies instead that China's population today is some 600 million fewer due to the program since 1970. Current debates are not about the impact of the overall program but rather the relative contribution of one-child limits to that program. To date, critics of China's official estimate have yet to acknowledge just how large an impact the overall program has had. Previously, the fine is so-called "social maintenance fee" and it is the punishment for the families who have more than one child. According to the policy, the families who violate the law may bring the burden to the whole sociey. Therefore, the social maintenance fee will be used for the operation of the basic government.

Two-child policy 

On 29 October 2015, it was reported that the existing law would be changed to a two-child policy, citing a statement from the Chinese Communist Party. And from the 1st of January 2016, the policy had become effective following its passage in the standing committee of the National People's Congress on 27 December 2015. 

The Two-child policy was implemented primarily to solve the problem of population ageing. The policy was intended to stimulate and increase the birth rate considering that, from 2010~2015, the population growth in China was well under the average of the world's population growth rate.  However, unlike the One-child policy, the Two-child policy was a not a mandatory requirement as it was opened to any eligible families who wished to have a second child. 

An increase in birth rate occurred in 2016 as the policy was implemented.  However, the birthrate decreased again in the following years, reaching the lowest point at 2018, with only 15.23 million new born.

Three-child policy 

In May 2021, the Seventh National Population Census showed a total population of 1.41 billion, but some serious issues were revealed, including the continuous decline of birth rate and population ageing. At the end of the month, the Politburo of the Chinese Communist Party further relaxed its family planning measures to the "three-child policy".

After only two months, in July 2021, all family size limits as well as penalties for exceeding them were removed. China's Sichuan Province had apparently maintained their three-child policy after the national government had abolished theirs, because in January 2023, the Sichuan Provincial government announced that they had abolished the three-child policy in their province.

Additional pronatalist policies 
Accompanying the Two-child policy, the central Chinese government and local governments also provided incentives for childbearing to families expecting their first or eligible to have a second child. Starting in 2017, regional governments in China introduced preferential policies to increase the birth rate such as reducing taxes, providing subsidies for childcare, and extending paid maternity and paternity leave for both parents.

Examples of regional incentive policies:
 On 26 September 2016, Guangdong, one of the most populated provinces in China, extended the paid maternity leave from 128–158 days to 178–208 days (after 09/26/2016).
 On March 31, 2016, Chongqing passed the bill for a 15-day paternity leave and extended the maternity leave to 128 days (originally 98 days) with an add-on that maternity leave is optional until the baby is one year old.
 In 2019, Liaoning, one of the provinces with the lowest population growth rate, passed legislation to not only extend paid maternity leave for 60 days and paternity leave to 15 days but also provide subsidies for pre-school education.

See also 
Malthusian League
Thomas Robert Malthus
An Essay on the Principle of Population
Margaret Sanger
Planned Parenthood

References 

 
One-child policy
Human overpopulation
Birth control in China